Annulobalcis aurisflamma is a species of sea snail, a marine gastropod mollusc in the family Eulimidae.

Distribution

Description
The maximum recorded shell length is 11 mm.

Habitat
Minimum recorded depth is 0 m. Maximum recorded depth is 8 m.

References

External links
 To World Register of Marine Species

Eulimidae
Gastropods described in 1995